Martinovich is a surname. It can be an anglicization of Martinović.

Notable people with the surname include:

Glafira Martinovich (born 1989), Belarusian gymnast
 (born 1990), Australian model
Phil Martinovich (1915–1964), American football player

See also
Marinovich
Martinich

Surnames from given names